Cool Earth is a UK-based international NGO that protects endangered rainforest in order to combat global warming, protect ecosystems and to provide employment for local people.

The organisation receives its income through business partnerships, trust funds and individual contributions from over 50,000 sponsors in order to secure specific tracts of endangered rainforest. Through the Cool Earth website, an individual can donate to support rainforest and indigenous communities to protect their rainforest.

In 2015, it was named Charity of the Year in its category at the Civil Society Media Charity Awards and best International NGO at the PEA Awards. It is supported by various celebrities including Professor James Lovelock, Dame Vivienne Westwood, Kelly Hoppen, Ricky Gervais, and Sir David Attenborough.

History 

Cool Earth was founded in 2007 by entrepreneur Johan Eliasch and MP Frank Field out of their common interest in protecting the rainforest. They argued that it was unacceptable that the 20% of carbon emissions created by tropical deforestation were ignored by the Kyoto protocol and that urgent, direct action was needed to put a stop to deforestation, lest it take up to twenty years to get an idea adopted by the political bureaucracy.

Activities 
Cool Earth's ethos is that the most effective custodians of rainforests are the people who have lived there for generations as they have the most to lose from its destruction. Their approach is to work with indigenous and rainforest-based communities to secure threatened rainforest that, within 18 months or less, would otherwise be sold to loggers and ranchers. The charity provides local people with the support they need to get income from the forest without cutting it down so that the forest is worth more intact. This is done by concentrating on three key areas, these are:

 Forest Protection
 Income Generation
 Partner Support
The provision of resources for these areas enables the building of sustainable livelihoods, better schools, better clinics and the empowerment of partner villages to monitor their forest and secure it from illegal logging. This basic model used by Cool Earth has been described as "simple but so intelligent" by the Times journalist Deborah Ross.
Cool Earth is currently working alongside 13 partners to protect nearly 100,000 hectares of rainforest across 3 continents. The organisation is currently active in 6 countries: Cambodia, Cameroon, the Democratic Republic of Congo, Mozambique, Papua New Guinea, and Peru; and has previously finished work in Brazil and Ecuador. 
The charity argues that to be selected each project must fulfill the following criteria:

 They are located where rainforest is immediately threatened by human activities like logging and cattle ranching;
 Their location or their conservation acts as a protective blockade for the forest beyond them, ensuring optimum protection of forests;
 They are mature rainforests with high levels of biodiversity.

In Peru the charity is working with two indigenous communities at the frontline of deforestation, the Ashaninka and the Awajún.

Cool Earth has been partnered with villages in the Asháninka community since 2008, after they contacted the charity desperate to be able to turn loggers away despite living below the poverty line. The project has expanded to 14 other Asháninka villages and the support from Cool Earth has enabled the villages to carry out activities such as strengthen register community associations, demarcate their community borders, carry out voluntary patrols, enable emergency evacuations, establish a cacao and coffee producers association, provide mosquito nets for every villager, build medical outposts and improve primary schools.
The partnership with the Awajún villages in Northern Peru, near the Ecuadorian border is aiming to protect 56,000 acres of forest. The key activities being supported are the development of cacao production, fish farms and traditional jewellery. The jewellery producers use seeds harvested from the rainforest and their work has inspired Vivienne Westwood’s Gold Label Collection and featured in her Paris fashion show.

In the Democratic Republic of the Congo, the charity has been working since 2014 with five rainforest villages in the remote province of Maniema. Here civil war has resulted in the people living in extreme poverty. So far Cool Earth has helped improve the villages rights over their forest through training of local people in GPS mapping and plotting 600,000 acres of community forest.

Cool Earth's youngest project is in Papua New Guinea and was launched in September 2015. It is working with three indigenous and rainforest coastal villages on the edge of the palm plantation frontier. They are aiming to build sustainable livelihoods to enable the villagers to halt the advance of the palm plantations from the east and protect the pristine rainforest behind.

Cool Earth is one of three bodies supporting The Queen's Commonwealth Canopy, a project launched in 2015 to preserve and promote forested areas throughout the Commonwealth.

Criticism

In 2008, Cool Earth's approach was criticized in Brazil by then-President Luiz Inácio Lula da Silva and TV show Fantástico for buying up Brazilian rainforest land. Cool Earth provided a response to clarify that the organisation never has and never will acquire rainforest, instead providing grant funding and technical support to native communities wanting to protect their rainforest. The Guardian concluded that "the organisation could not buy up the Amazon, even if it wanted to, since much of it is already in public hands" and also due to Cool Earth's limited financial resources.

Recognition

Cool Earth has been supported by notable people and ambassadors including Professor James Lovelock, Dame Vivienne Westwood, Pamela Anderson, Kate Moss, Professor Lord Stern, Dr Tony Juniper, Kelly Hoppen, Leah Wood, Nick Baker, Gillian Burke and Dr John Hemming.

In 2015, it was named Charity of the Year in its category at the Civil Society Media Charity Awards and best International NGO at the PEA Awards.

In 2016, a detailed external evaluation of Cool Earth undertaken by Giving What We Can found Cool Earth to be the most cost-effective charity working on mitigating climate change through direct action. The report concluded: "Cool Earth is overall the most cost-effective climate change charity which can reliably reduce emissions without risk."

As of January 2021, Cool Earth is not yet rated by Charity Navigator.

See also

 Eden Reforestation Projects

References

External links 
 Cool Earth

Charities based in Cornwall
Climate change organisations based in the United Kingdom
Forest conservation organizations
Foreign charities operating in Peru
Foreign charities operating in the Democratic Republic of the Congo
Foreign charities operating in Papua New Guinea